The 2016–17 LPB season was the 84th season of the premier Portuguese basketball league, and the ninth season under the current Liga Portuguesa de Basquetebol (LPB) format. For sponsorship reasons, the league is also known as Liga Placard.

Benfica won its 27th title and recovered the title after beating defending champions Porto in the finals by 3–0.

Format
The competition format consisted of two stages: a regular season, comprising two phases, and the play-offs. In the first phase of the regular season, the twelve participating teams compete against each other in a double round-robin system, with home and away matches. Match wins, draws and losses are worth two, one and zero points, respectively. The second phase of the regular season comprises two groups; the six best-ranked teams at the end of the first phase compete in Group A, and the remaining six teams compete in Group B. Again, teams in each group compete against each other in a double round-robin system, with home and away matches. The six Group A teams and the two best-ranked Group B teams qualify for the play-offs, while the two worst-ranked teams in Group B are relegated to the second-tier Proliga. The play-offs are disputed as a single-elimination tournament, with fixtures determined by each team's classification in the previous round, and comprise three knockout rounds (quarter-finals, semi-finals and finals) played in a best-of-five system.

Teams
Maia Basket Escapeforte avoided relegation after the resign of Atlético Clube de Portugal to promote. Also, Sampaense promoted after Barcelos decided to dissolve its senior team.

First phase

League table

Results

Second phase
In the second phase, teams started their group matches with the results from the matches played against the remaining teams in the same group, during the first phase.

Group A

Group B

Playoffs
Seeded teams played games 1, 2 and 5 at home.

Portuguese clubs in European competitions

References

External links
FPB website 

Liga Portuguesa de Basquetebol seasons
Portuguese
LPB